Levocardia is where the heart is on the normal side of the body (the left), as opposed to dextrocardia, in which the heart is in the right side of the thoracic cavity. This can be associated with situs solitus, where the remainder of the organs are on normal side as well; or situs inversus, in which the viscera (stomach, liver, intestines, lungs, etc.) on the opposite side as normal. The latter condition may or may not be associated with clinically relevant abnormalities.

See also
 Isolated levocardia

References

External links 

Congenital disorders of circulatory system